Nõmme is a village in Ridala Parish, Lääne County, in western Estonia.

Nõmme village comprises the territory of former village Pullapää.

See also
Pullapää crisis

References

 

Villages in Lääne County